The Cypher is an interactive fiction video game by EPG Media Inc.

Plot and Gameplay 
The Cypher is a digital interactive fiction novel in eight episodic chapters that explores a murder mystery spanning ten centuries. Characters include a medieval lord, a 1900s archaeologist and a modern-day criminologist.

Players act as time-traveling detectives investigating two murders committed by the same murderer a thousand years apart. They explore numerous locations as they hunt for clues, a hidden chamber beneath a medieval castle, the offices of a Scotland Yard inspector, and the hotel room of a modern-day cryptologist. Along the way, players sift through forensic evidence, examine ancient manuscripts, decode encrypted emails, pore over illuminated books, or puzzle over ancient technology.

The story opens with John Shoresby, a cryptanalyst for SciCrypt Systems, who receives an email message from an unknown sender with no traceable source and no Internet identifier, as if from thin air. The message pleads for his help and asks him to look into a hundred year old missing person's case. When he downloads the email attachments, he recognizes the face of one of his ancestors, James Francis Ravenshim, an archeologist that vanished without a trace in the summer of 1900. Intrigued, he starts to dig into the case and discovers nothing is what it seems. James Francis’ disappearance wasn't the only inexplicable event that occurred all those years ago at Ravenshim Castle, his family's ancestral home. Weeks before, a man was found murdered in one of the underground chambers. Scotland Yard removed the body for an autopsy, but before they could examine it, the body shriveled up and mummified right before their eyes!

Shoresby continues to chase down clues, but faces obstruction at every turn. He discovers there may have been a cover up of the murder and the disappearance, aided by Scotland Yard, which ended with the complete destruction of Ravenshim Castle. What was everyone hiding and why were they still hiding it a hundred years later?

Production 
EPG Multimedia was founded to "explore the potential of interactive media". Its three founders, Ted Evans, Vince Peddle and Paul Gregutt, had backgrounds in advertising and corporate communications, and believed that interactive digital media was the best new method of delivering entertainment to the masses. They noticed that video game publishing seemed to "offer small, startup companies a chance to break into the entertainment business", and so while they were still employed at other companies, the founders began brainstorming ideas for "games that would take advantage of those opportunities". They actively wanted to push against the shovelware-filled reference titles, game titles, or children's titles that dominated the industry, and instead decided to lead the creative team for StarPress Publishing's "Material World". The program, which favoured good storytelling over gaming allowed the three to start up their own studio.

The Cypher became the  first completely original interactive project the EPG undertook; it was created on a shoestring budget to counteract the pattern of startup developers being at great financial risk. The team chose to focus on plot and character over puzzles and games, and favoured letting  players discover the story rather than take part in it. The game's graphic style was created by Evans. Early on in development the team decided to serialise the game rather than release it in all at once, an idea inspired by the work of Charles Dickens and Philip Francis Nowlan as it forces the writers to incorporate cliffhangers and aided them keeping the costs down.

In June 1996, it was announced that EPG Multimedia was in the process of developing the eight episode interactive novel in an early version of Macromedia Director, with four of the episodes ready for initial release. The episodes were distributed on "Launch," a bimonthly entertainment CD-ROM. The creators noted that the magazine content ate up most of the CD-ROM space which meant their content could only take up 15 MB per episode, which required them to tell an expansive narrative while remaining concise. The original four episodes were released by Christmas 1996. The soundtrack for the CD ROM and online versions of "The Cypher", The Cypher Suite, was composed and performed by Kimara Sajn/Precognitive Music and recorded in 1996. After the initial episodic run on LAUNCH, the developers published a single CD ROM for Mac OS and Windows with the entire The Cypher narrative including an extra 'bonus' episode, which was also distributed by Launch.

With the initial success of The Cypher in the US, EPG Media partnered with Pete Brady of the UK production company Clearwater to publish the title in the UK and translate it into French and German. They aimed to follow up the original story with another adventure that had greater use of film, video and the internet. Players could win a copy of the game by emailing the company with the heading "Cypher Contest". By 2000, the game was playable on gameplay.com in the UK and Europe. The game was under a Sierra/WON.net license, uploaded free to the internet on October 28, 1998 which ended December 1999. The Cypher and EPG Media's follow-up game, S.P.I.T.E, had a combined registered user database of 12 million, and hits that reached over four million a week. On Sierra's World Opponent Network (WON.net), it had over 2 million registered players and 2.5 million page views per month. By 2000, the game was licensed by EPG sister company BE Studios which was headed up by Evans.

Critical reception 
Desktop Publishing compared it to The Residents’ Bad Day on the Mid-way and The Dark Eye, both from Inscape. Media Inc. felt the game marked a "new genre of interactive fiction ".  Mac Home Journal said it "represent(s) the next step in the evolution of interactive narrative".

The project has won several multimedia awards in the US including a 1996 NewMedia Invision Bronze Award for Best Adult Entertainment Title. It also won the 1999 Invision Awards (New Media) - Gold, and 1996 Association for Multimedia Intl. Best of Show - The Cypher.

As part of the Launch CD-ROM, the game was viewed by over 250,000 readers.

References

External links 

 The Cypher intro video in HD
 Original page for The Cypher on Launch
 Listing in The Multimedia and CD-ROM Directory 1998

1996 video games
1998 video games
Web fiction
1990s interactive fiction
Detective video games
Point-and-click adventure games
Video games developed in the United States
Video games set in castles
Windows games
Classic Mac OS games
Online games
Single-player video games